Kabir (also Romanized as Kabīr; also known as Ka’īr) is a village in Siyah Banuiyeh Rural District, in the Central District of Rabor County, Kerman Province, Iran. At the 2006 census, its population was 191, in 40 families.

References 

Populated places in Rabor County